Israel competed at the 2020 Summer Olympics in Tokyo with its largest contingent to date − a delegation of 90 athletes, 55 men and 35 women, who competed in 15 different sports. This was almost double the previous number of 47 athletes who represented Israel at the 2016 Rio de Janeiro Olympics. The Games were also Israel's most successful to date, winning four medals, including two gold. At Tokyo, Israel marked its Olympic debuts in surfing (new to the 2020 Games), baseball (returning to the Games), archery, equestrian and marathon swimming. 

Israel returned home from Tokyo with two gold and two bronze medals, a record number of medals won by Israel in one Olympics. Artistic gymnast Artem Dolgopyat won the gold medal in the men's floor exercise and rhythmic gymnast Linoy Ashram won the gold medal at the women's rhythmic individual all-around event. Taekwondo practitioner Avishag Semberg won the bronze medal in the Women's 49 kg category and the national judo team won another bronze medal in the mixed team event. Several Israeli athletes advanced to the finals of their respective sporting events, but narrowly missed out on standing on the winner's podium.

Originally scheduled to take place in the summer of 2020, the Games were postponed because of the COVID-19 pandemic until 23 July to 8 August 2021. Since Israel's debut in 1952, Israeli athletes have appeared in every edition of the Summer Olympic Games, other than the 1980 Summer Olympics in Moscow, which it opted not to attend because of the nation's support for the US-led boycott. This was Israel's 17th appearance at the Summer Olympics.

Backstroke swimmer Yakov Toumarkin and triple jumper Hanna Knyazyeva-Minenko were chosen as the nation's flag bearers at the opening ceremony and Linoy Ashram was chosen as the nation's flag bearer at the closing ceremony. 

Also, for the first time since 11 Israeli athletes and a West German police officer were murdered during the Munich Olympics in 1972 by the Palestinian terrorist group Black September, a moment of silence was held during the opening ceremony of the Olympic Games.

Medalists

Competitors

The Israeli delegation includes 90 athletes, competing in 15 sports.

This was Alexander Shatilov's fourth appearance at the Olympics, and Sergey Richter's, Yakov Toumarkin's, and Misha Zilberman's third appearance. Nine members of the delegation participated in the games for the second time: Lonah Chemtai Salpeter, Gili Cohen, Shlomi Haimy, Sagi Muki, Andrea Murez, Shira Rishony, Or Sasson, Marhu Teferi, and Maor Tiyouri. 

This was Alberto Michán's third appearance at the Olympics, but was the first time he represented Israel. Hanna Knyazyeva-Minenko also appeared for the third time at the Olympics, but only for the second time as part of the Israeli delegation.

Seven athletes from the delegation have previously participated in the Youth Olympic Games: Linoy Ashram, Gal Cohen Groumi, Artem Dolgopyat, Anastasia Gorbenko, Denis Loktev, Avishag Semberg, and Yakov Toumarkin.

Schedule
This schedule shows all the events in which Israeli athletes have participated or may participate.

All times and dates use Japan Standard Time (UTC+9)

Archery

One Israeli archer qualified directly for the men's individual recurve at the Games, by reaching the quarterfinals and obtaining one of the seven available spots at the 2021 Final Qualification Tournament in Paris, France. This marked Israel's debut in Olympic archery.

Artistic swimming

Israel fielded a squad of two artistic swimmers to compete in the women's duet event, by finishing sixth at the 2021 FINA Olympic Qualification Tournament in Barcelona, Spain.

Athletics

Nine Israeli athletes met the entry standards, either by qualifying time or by world ranking, in the following track and field events (up to a maximum of 3 athletes in each event):

Track & road events
Men

Women

Field events

Badminton

Israel entered two badminton players (one per gender) into the Olympic tournament. Misha Zilberman and Ksenia Polikarpova were selected to compete at the Games each in the men's and women's singles based on the BWF World Race to Tokyo Rankings.

Baseball

The current Israel national baseball team that competes at the 2020 Summer Olympics is composed mostly of American Jews with only four Israeli-born players.

The Israel national baseball team qualified for the Olympics by winning the gold medal at the 2019 WSBC Africa and Europe Qualification Tournament in Italy and securing an outright berth, marking the country's Olympic debut in baseball.

Team roster

Group play

Round 1

Round 2

Round 1 repechage

Cycling

Road

Israeli road cyclist Omer Shapira ranked 60th in the Individual UCI World Ranking for women with 316.17 points and won a quota for Israel. Shapira also finished 13th at the Women individual time trial event at the 2019 UCI Road World Championships, but after decreasing to one athlete per country, Shapira placed eighth. The first 10 places automatically qualified their country to the women's individual time trial event. The Israel Cycling Federation decided that Shapira would be the Israeli road cyclist representative for the games.

Mountain biking
Israel qualified one men mountain biker based on the 2019 UCI Mountain Bike World Championships when Shlomi Haimy finished in 30th place. Israel was the second-highest ranked country which had not yet qualified any quota places through the UCI Olympic Mountain Biking rankings. The Israel Cycling Federation decided that Haimy would be the Israeli mountain biker representative for the games.

Equestrian

Israel fielded a squad of three equestrian riders in the Olympic team jumping competition. In July 2019, Team Israel's Daniel Bluman, Ashlee Bond, Danielle G. Waldman, and Elad Yaniv won the Olympic Jumping Qualifier at Maxima Park in Moscow, qualifying for the Tokyo Olympics, the first time that Israel has earned a place in the Olympics in equestrian. However, due to a technicality regarding the registration of his horse Gemma W, Bluman was deemed ineligible to compete just weeks prior to the start of the competition. The Israel Equestrian Federation decided that Ashlee Bond, Alberto Michán, Danielle G. Waldman, and Teddy Vlock would represent Israel at the games, with the identity of the three riders who would participate in each day's event to be determined the day before.

Jumping
Danielle G. Waldman and Queensland E have been named the traveling alternates.

Gymnastics

Artistic
Israel entered two artistic gymnasts into the Olympic competition. Three-time Olympian Alexander Shatilov booked a spot in the men's individual all-around and apparatus events, by finishing seventh out of the 12 gymnasts eligible for qualification at the 2019 World Championships in Stuttgart, Germany, while Artem Dolgopyat secured one of the three places available for individual-based gymnasts, neither part of the team nor qualified through the all-around, in the floor exercise at the same tournament.

Lihie Raz received a spare berth from the women's apparatus event, as one of the female gymnasts from the individual all-around, not yet qualified, at the 2019 World Championships. Raz qualified for the floor final at the 2020 European Women's Artistic Gymnastics Championships and thus met the Israeli criteria set by the Israeli Gymnastics Federation and ensured her participation in the Olympic Games.

Men

Women

Rhythmic

Linoy Ashram and Nicol Zelikman secured two quotas for the Israeli delegation by finishing third and eleventh, respectively, at the 2019 World Championships all-around individual event. Also, Israel qualified a squad of rhythmic gymnasts for the group all-around by virtue of finishing within the top-five among National Olympic Committees that are not yet qualified at the 2019 World Championships.

Judo

Israel qualified a squad of 12 judoka (six men and six women) for each of the following weight classes at the Games by the IJF World Ranking List of 28 June 2021.

Men

Women

Mixed

The Tokyo games hosted the first Judo Mixed team event. Nations qualifying at least one athlete in the −57 (−48, −52 & -57), −70 (−57, −63 & -70) & +70 (−70, −78 & +78) weight categories for women, and at least one athlete in the −73 (−60, −66 & -73), −90 (−73, −81 & -90) & +90 (−90, −100 & +100) weight categories for men, would compete in the team event. The Israeli team has qualified to the event, and won a bronze medal.

Sailing

Israeli sailors qualified three boats in each of the following classes. Gil Cohen and Noa Lasry secured a quota for the Israeli delegation by finishing eleventh in the women's 470 event at the 2018 Sailing World Championships in Aarhus, Denmark. Ofek Elimelech and Mia Morris finished twelfth and fourteenth in their respective RS:X class. Both of these results promised two more quotas for the Israeli delegation. Shay Kakon secured another quota for the Israeli delegation through the Europe Laser Radial qualification event in Vilamoura, Portugal.

Katy Spychakov secured her place on the Israeli squad, after she topped the overall ranking of Israel's selection meets. Yoav Cohen finished in fifth place at the 2021 RS:X World Championships and tied with Shahar Tzuberi in israel’s selection ranking. Gur Steinberg, the team's coach, decided that Cohen would be the representative for the Games instead of Zubari, who had been chosen before the postponement of the Olympics. Shahar Tibi and Noya Bar Am were chosen to represent Israel in the 470 event, while Kakon was selected in the women's Laser Radial.

Shooting

Israeli shooter Sergey Richter achieved quota places for the delegation in the men's 10 metre air rifle, by winning the gold medal at the 2019 European Games.
This was his third appearance at the Olympics.

Surfing

Israel sent one surfer to compete in the women's shortboard at the Games. Anat Lelior secured a qualification slot for the nation as the highest-ranked surfer from Europe and one of the top 30 surfers in the overall open division at the 2019 ISA World Surfing Games in Miyazaki, Japan.

Swimming

Qualification for Israeli swimmers in the individual swimming events in Tokyo is accomplished by achieving the qualifying standards in the events (up to a maximum of 2 swimmers in each event at the Olympic Qualifying Time (OQT), and potentially 1 at the Olympic Selection Time (OST)): All Israeli swimmers must attain the FINA Olympic A-cut at one of the selection meets approved by the Israeli Swimming Association (ISA), or one percent faster at any other competition.

Israel can also enter a team for relay events with a top-12 finish at the 2019 FINA World Championships, provided that at least two swimmers in each relay event are qualified for any of the individual events.

Matan Roditi became the first Israeli swimmer to compete in the open water marathon at the Games after finishing fourth in the 10 km at the 2021 FINA Olympic Marathon Swim Qualifier in Setubal, Portugal. 

Men

Women

Mixed

Taekwondo

Israel entered one athlete into the taekwondo competition at the Games. Avishag Semberg secured a spot in the women's flyweight category (49 kg) with a top-two finish at the 2021 European Qualification Tournament in Sofia, Bulgaria. The 19-year-old won the bronze medal.

Triathlon

Israel entered two triathletes to compete at the Games. Brothers Ran and Shachar Sagiv were selected among the top 26 triathletes competing in the men's event based on the ITU World Rankings. The Olympic Committee of Israel confirmed the participation of the two.

Weightlifting

Israel entered one weightlifter into the Olympic competition. David Litvinov received the slot left open by Brazilian Fernando Reis after he failed the pre-competition drug test.

See also
Israel at the Olympics
Israel at the 2020 Summer Paralympics

References

Olympics
2020
Nations at the 2020 Summer Olympics